Caroline E. Harris (November 11, 1867 – April 23, 1937) was an American actress. She appeared in 12 films between 1909 and 1917. Her last film was The Gulf Between, the first film released in the Technicolor process.

Harris was the mother of the American film actor Richard Barthelmess.

She died in New York, New York.

Partial filmography
 To Save Her Soul (1909)
 Madame Butterfly (1915)
 Gold and the Woman (1916)
 The Ragged Princess (1916)
 The Eternal Sapho (1916)
 The Gulf Between (1917)
 The Boy Girl (1917)

References

External links

1867 births
1937 deaths
American film actresses
American silent film actresses
20th-century American actresses